Marionville is a city in Lawrence County, Missouri, United States. The population was 2,225 at the 2010 census.

Marionville is known for its large population of white squirrels.

History
Marionville was platted in 1854. The city name has been erroneously attributed as namesake of Francis Marion.  It is, in fact, named to honor early settler and founder, James Marion Moore.  Other names were considered - Jamestown/Jamesville and Moorestown/Mooresville - but were already taken and Moore's middle name was then used.  A post office called Marionville has been in operation since 1864. On March 12, 2006, a tornado hit the town, destroying houses and killing two people. It was rated as an F3.

The town's two most famous residents are a colony of white squirrels (inhabitants since the 1880s) and legendary tubist Harvey Phillips.

Geography
Marionville is located at  (37.000361, -93.638026).

Marionville has a population of white squirrels, which is one of a handful of such populations in the United States. They can be seen in yards near the Ozarks Methodist Manor.

Government
On April 21, 2014, the Marionville mayor, Dan Clevenger, resigned.  He resigned over anti-Semitic remarks he made in the wake of the arrest of resident Frazier Glenn Miller Jr., whom he was friends with years earlier and had advocated for despite Miller's bigotry, for committing a shooting at a Jewish Community Center in Overland Park, Kansas.  A 4–1 vote by aldermen to begin the impeachment process prompted Clevenger's decision to quit.

Demographics

2010 census
As of the census of 2010, there were 2,225 people, 900 households, and 587 families living in the city. The racial makeup of the city was 96.3% White, 0.4% Native American, 0.4% Asian, 0.3% from other races, and 2.6% from two or more races. Hispanic or Latino of any race were 1.5% of the population.

There were 900 households, of which 31.3% had children under the age of 18 living with them, 48.3% were married couples living together, 12.4% had a female householder with no husband present, 4.4% had a male householder with no wife present, and 34.8% were non-families. 30.0% of all households were made up of individuals, and 16.8% had someone living alone who was 65 years of age or older. The average household size was 2.39 and the average family size was 2.92.

The median age in the city was 40.5 years. 24.4% of residents were under the age of 18; 7.8% were between the ages of 18 and 24; 22.1% were from 25 to 44; 22.6% were from 45 to 64; and 23% were 65 years of age or older. The gender makeup of the city was 45.7% male and 54.3% female.

2000 census
As of the census of 2000, there were 2,113 people, 871 households and 562 families living in the city. The population density was 1,525.6 people per square mile (586.9/km). There were 993 housing units at an average density of 716.9 per square mile (275.8/km). The racial makeup of the city was 97.11% White, 0.09% African American, 0.66% Native American, 0.38% Asian, 0.33% from other races, and 1.42% from two or more races. Hispanic, Latino or any other race accounted for 0.62% of the population.

There were 871 households, out of which 30.1% had children under the age of 18, 48.8% were married couples living together, 11.5% had a female householder with no husband present, 0.12% had a female household with someone else's husband present, and 35.4% were non-families. Approximately 30.9% of all households were made up of individuals, and 17.3% had someone living alone who was 65 years of age or older. The average household size was 2.30, and the average family size was 2.86.

In the city, 24.5% of the population were under the age of 18, 8.5% were ages 18 to 24, 25.7% were ages 25 to 44, 18.4% were ages 45 to 64, and 22.9% were 65 or older. The median age was 38 years. For every 100 females, there were 83.6 males. For every 100 females age 18 and over, there were 78.8 males.

The median household income in Marionville was $25,078 per year at the time of the census, and the median income for a family was $30,607 per year. Males had a median income of $24,792 per year, versus $17,188 per year for females. The per capita income for the city was $13,552 annually. About 19.5% of families and 22.0% of the population were below the poverty line, including 32.7% of those under age 18 and 9.0% of those age 65 or over.

Education
Marionville R-IX School District operates one elementary school, one middle school, and Marionville High School.

Marionville has a public library, a branch of the Barry-Lawrence Regional Library.

References

External links
 City of Marionville official website
 Historic maps of Marionville in the Sanborn Maps of Missouri Collection at the University of Missouri

Cities in Lawrence County, Missouri
Cities in Missouri